is a Japanese water polo player. He competed in the men's tournament at the 1964 Summer Olympics.

References

External links
 

1941 births
Living people
Japanese male water polo players
Olympic water polo players of Japan
Water polo players at the 1964 Summer Olympics
Place of birth missing (living people)
20th-century Japanese people
21st-century Japanese people